Hillman Peak is an  summit on the west rim of Crater Lake in Crater Lake National Park, Oregon. It is the highest peak on the caldera rim and ranks as the second-highest peak in the park. It is situated 1.5 mile northwest of Wizard Island. Topographic relief is significant as the summit rises 1,973 feet above the lake in 0.57 mile. Rim Drive traverses the western slope of the peak. Precipitation runoff from the peak's east slope drains into Crater Lake whereas the west slope drains to the Rogue River via Copeland Creek.

History
Hillman Peak was named by William Gladstone Steel for John Wesley Hillman (1832–1915), a prospector who discovered Crater Lake on June 12, 1853. The peak's "Hillman Peak" toponym was officially adopted in 1928 by the United States Board on Geographic Names. Variant names prior to 1928 included Glacier Peak and Maxwell Peak.

Climate

Based on the Köppen climate classification, Hillman Peak has a subalpine climate. Most weather fronts originate in the Pacific Ocean, and travel east toward the Cascades where they are forced upward by the range (Orographic lift), causing them to drop their moisture in the form of rain or snowfall. As a result, the Cascades experience high precipitation, especially during the winter months in the form of snowfall. Winter temperatures can drop below  with wind chill factors below . In the Crater Lake area, winter lasts eight months with an average snowfall of 41 feet (12.5 m) per year. During winter months, weather is usually cloudy, but due to high pressure systems over the Pacific Ocean that intensify during summer months, there is often little or no cloud cover during the summer.

Geology

Hillman Peak was created when Mount Mazama, a large stratovolcano erupted violently approximately 7,700 years ago and formed on the caldera rim. The peak is the remnant of a parasitic cone on the western flank of Mount Mazama, such that when the caldera formed, the eastern half of the Hillman cone disappeared. The peak is composed of lava flows containing pyroxene and hornblende andesites and breccias. Evidence suggests that the pre-eruption Hillman cone acted as a cleaver which was never entirely covered by glacial ice.

See also
 
 Applegate Peak
 Llao Rock

Gallery

References

External links

 National Geodetic Survey Data Sheet
 Crater Lake National Park (National Park Service)
 Weather forecast: Hillman Peak

Cascade Range
Cascade Volcanoes
Volcanoes of Oregon
Volcanoes of Klamath County, Oregon
Crater Lake National Park
Mountains of Klamath County, Oregon
Mountains of Oregon
North American 2000 m summits